mnoGoSearch is an open-source web search engine for Microsoft Windows and Linux.

References

free search engine software
internet search engines